Cora was launched in 1812 and came to England from New Providence. She sailed to Britain and between 1813 and 1820 she was a West Indiaman. Then in 1820 she sailed to the New South Shetland Islands to engage in seal hunting. She was wrecked there in 1821.

Career
Cora entered Lloyd's Register in 1813 with J. Kitchen, master, H. Wood, owner, and trade Liverpool–New Providence. She had damages repaired in 1814. Cora returned to the West Indies and then sailed from New Providence on 26 September, arriving at Liverpool in late November.

Lloyd's Register for 1820 showed Fildes replacing Kitchen as master, and Coras trade changing from Liverpool–New Providence to Liverpool–South Seas. Robert Fildes (or Fyldes), was Henry Wood's son-in-law. He sailed to the South Shetlands, and Desolation Island.

Fate
Cora was lost at Desolation Island on 6 January 1821. The cove where Cora was lost was later named Cora Cove. Fildes lived in a hut made from Coras wreckage and spent his time while awaiting rescue by preparing several charts and sailing directions for the islands. In particular, Fildes in 1821 introduced the name Livingston Island for the second largest island in the South Shetlands, known then as 'Friesland Island' or 'Smolensk Island'. , Captain Spiller, master, brought Fildes and some of his crew back to England, as well as eight men from another damaged sealer.

Robert was lost in the Islands in early 1822.

Notes

Citations

References
 
 
 
 

1812 ships
Age of Sail merchant ships of England
Sealing ships
Maritime incidents in January 1821